The Tramp is Charlie Chaplin's sixth film for Essanay Studios and was released in 1915. Directed by Chaplin, it was the fifth and last film made at Essanay's Niles, California studio. The Tramp marked the beginning of The Tramp character most known today, even though Chaplin played the character in earlier films. This film marked the first departure from his more slapstick character in the earlier films, with a sad ending and showing he cared for others, rather than just himself. The film co-stars Edna Purviance as the farmer's daughter and Ernest Van Pelt as Edna's father. The outdoor scenes were filmed on location near Niles.

Plot
The film starts with the Tramp walking down the road. He doesn't see a car come by and he barely manages to escape. A few seconds later, another car floors the Tramp.

Not being able to fathom what just happened, he dusts himself off and decides to seek refuge in a nearby farm. There, he does the classic gag of doffing his hat to a tree. He sits underneath it and decides to eat his sandwich.

However, a hobo exchanges the Tramp's sandwich for a brick, so the Tramp must eat grass. The Tramp sees this, and knows he cannot do anything, so he just sits there. The same hobo, however, molests a farmer's daughter (Edna Purviance), and she runs up to the Tramp, who comes to her aid with the help of the brick. The hobo tries getting the Tramp out of the way, but the Tramp kicks him off.

Two more hobos show up when the angry hobo tells them about how the Tramp humiliated him, but these are no bother for the Tramp, who throws all three into the lake. However, they have their fifteen seconds of fame when they throw stones at the Tramp, and he sits down on a bunch of logs and sets his posterior on fire. He sits down in a sewage pipe to cool his posterior off, where Edna finds him.

The grateful girl takes the Tramp home, where the farmer's father decides that "as a reward, you can work". Edna seats herself on the lunch table, and, unaware about this, the Tramp throws his brick on the table, giving the table a jolt.

There, he helps another farmhand with work. He gets a fork and frequently pokes the farmhand with it, especially while he is carrying loads, to make him move faster. When the Tramp attempts helping him with the load, he does a terrible job. He climbs up a ladder, takes the load and, instead of climbing down to keep the load down, just throws it down. Later, they realize that he threw the load down on another man, who's passed out under the sheer weight.

This over, him and the farmhand go to get the eggs that the chicks lay. However, the duo get into a tiff, where the Tramp smashes an egg on the farmhand's forehead. It smells disgusting, so they think about what they can do with it.

They see a man enjoying nature with a spiritual book. The Tramp suddenly gets an idea. While the man is enjoying nature, and unaware that the spiritual book actually exists, the Tramp sneakily puts the smashed egg on the open page, and sneaks away. Just then, the man closes his book, and the egg yolk spills down on his coat. But he doesn't realize this as he's still lost to nature.

The Tramp suddenly gets a hunch that the hobos are planning another robbery, and the robbery features the house the Tramp resides in, so they go to the office. They tell the man inside about the planned robbery, but the man couldn't care less. So they devise a plan.

The Tramp takes a hammer and decides that, when the thieves try climbing in, he'll bust their heads with the hammer. He tells the farmhand to sleep off, with the intention of testing the hammer on him. Of course, the man sleeps off, and when the Tramp smashes the man's head, he wakes up immediately, in deep pain, and very angry with the Tramp.

Their hunch proves correct. The hobos try climbing in. However, the Tramp and the farmhand, unbeknownst to them, are ready for them, and the Tramp smashes their heads with the hammer, making them fall all the way down. The Tramp gives chase, just for fun, and the men manage to get away.

By this time, a scene has been created, and when the people realize what the Tramp had done, they thanked him profusely. Edna even offered to eat lunch with him. By now the Tramp was in love, so he readily agreed.

All seems well, until a man comes along and calls to Edna. Edna hurriedly tells the Tramp that a man has come to see her, and the Tramp readily agrees to let them see each other.

And the Tramp just watches as they kiss and hug.

The Tramp now knowing that the woman of his dreams is already in a relationship, introduces himself to Edna's sweetheart. He then excuses himself and goes back in. Unwilling to be a problem in their lives, he decides to leave a letter for them and then take to the road. He wrote: "I thort (thought) your kidness (kindness) was love, but I know it wasn't cause (because) I (I've) seen him. Good by (goodbye)."

He then goes to the road, where he knows he belongs. He is seen skipping and swinging his cane, happy that he is back on the road, where he is meant to be.

Cast

 Charlie Chaplin as The Tramp
 Edna Purviance as Farmer's daughter
 Lloyd Bacon as Edna's fiancé/Second thief
 Leo White as First thief
 Bud Jamison as Third thief
 Ernest Van Pelt as Farmer, Edna's father
 Paddy McGuire  as Farmhand
 Billy Armstrong as Minister

Reception
Like many American films of the time, The Tramp was subject to cuts by city and state film censorship boards. For example, the Chicago Board of Censors cut, in Reel 1, the scene of Chaplin sitting in a sewage drainage pipe after burning his posterior.

References

External links 

 
 
 
 

1915 films
American silent short films
Short films directed by Charlie Chaplin
American black-and-white films
1910s romantic comedy films
Essanay Studios films
American romantic comedy films
Films set in the San Francisco Bay Area
1915 short films
Articles containing video clips
1915 comedy films
1910s American films
Silent romantic comedy films
Silent American comedy films